Guangnania was a genus of Early Devonian land plant with branching axes.  It is thought to be related to the zosterophylls.

References 

Early Devonian plants
Zosterophylls
Prehistoric lycophyte genera